University of Dhi Qar  (Arabic: جامعة ذي قار) is an Iraqi university located in Nasiriyah, Iraq. It was established in 2000. Originally, the university was a branch of the University of Basrah, and the branch was established in 1992. Its first graduating class was in 1996. In 2000, the branch became independent of Basrah University and University of Dhi Qar  was founded.

Colleges
College of Medicine
College of Pharmacy
College of Dentistry
College of Engineering
College of Science
College of Agriculture and Marshes
College of Education
College of Law
College of Arts

Thi Qar
Educational institutions established in 2000
2000 establishments in Iraq